Anauxesis is a genus of beetles in the family Cerambycidae, containing the following species:

 Anauxesis albicans Breuning, 1938
 Anauxesis alboscutellaris Breuning, 1938
 Anauxesis andreaei Breuning, 1955
 Anauxesis atrata (Chevrolat, 1855)
 Anauxesis calabarica (Chevrolat, 1855) 
 Anauxesis cincticornis (Pascoe, 1857)
 Anauxesis congoensis Breuning, 1938
 Anauxesis densepunctata Breuning, 1954
 Anauxesis elongata (Brancsik, 1897)
 Anauxesis elongatoides Breuning, 1949
 Anauxesis flavofemorata Lepesme & Breuning, 1952
 Anauxesis kenyensis Breuning, 1938
 Anauxesis kolbei Hintz, 1919
 Anauxesis laterirufa Breuning, 1981
 Anauxesis nigroantennalis Breuning, 1955
 Anauxesis perrieri Fairmaire, 1902
 Anauxesis proxima Breuning, 1938
 Anauxesis rufa Breuning, 1948
 Anauxesis rufipennis Breuning, 1976
 Anauxesis rufoscapa Breuning, 1950
 Anauxesis simplex Jordan, 1904
 Anauxesis singularis Aurivillius, 1908
 Anauxesis vicina Breuning, 1938

References

Agapanthiini